Jonas Castrén (25 February 1850 – 10 October 1922) was a Finnish lawyer and politician, born in Pyhäjärvi. He was a member of the Diet of Finland in 1885, in 1888, in 1891, in 1894 and from 1905 to 1906 and of the Parliament of Finland from 1907 to 1917.

References

1850 births
1922 deaths
People from Pyhäjärvi
People from Oulu Province (Grand Duchy of Finland)
Young Finnish Party politicians
Members of the Diet of Finland
Members of the Parliament of Finland (1907–08)
Members of the Parliament of Finland (1908–09)
Members of the Parliament of Finland (1909–10)
Members of the Parliament of Finland (1910–11)
Members of the Parliament of Finland (1911–13)
Members of the Parliament of Finland (1913–16)
Members of the Parliament of Finland (1916–17)
University of Helsinki alumni